Sir Samuel Baker Secondary School was an only-boys boarding middle and high school before it turned to a mixed school as of 2019, located in Gulu, Gulu District in Northern Uganda. The school is named after Sir Samuel White Baker (8 June 1821 – 30 December 1893), the British explorer, officer, naturalist, big game hunter, engineer, writer and abolitionist.

Location
The coordinates of the school campus are:2°48'46.0"N, 32°19'27.0"E (Longitude:2.812778; Latitude:32.324167).

History

 1953 to 1971
The school was opened in 1953 by the Governor of Uganda Protectorate, one Sir Andrew Cohen. During the next twenty years, the school established itself as one of the best secondary schools in the country, in the areas of academics, sports and achievement of its alumni.

 1971 to 2010
When Idi Amin staged his coup d'état in January 1971, the standards at the school began to decline. Teachers and students began to vacate the school as they were ethnically targeted. Academic standards began to decline. There was a brief respite between 1980 and 1985, during the Obote II regime. However the decline was accelerated when the National Resistance Movement captured power in 1986. This led to a 20-year civil war in Northern Uganda, with the school campus at the centre of it, as the Lord's Resistance Army rebels invaded and ransacked the school, making it near-impossible to teach or learn.

 After 2010
In the period between the cessation of hostilities between the UPDF and LRA on Ugandan soil in 2006 and 2010, the Government of Belgium in collaboration with the Government of Uganda, renovated the school at a cost of UGX:6 billion (approx. US$2.4 million in 2010 money). The Belgian government contributed 81.7% of the funds (approx. US$1.96 million), while the Uganda government contributed 18.3% (approx. US$440,000). The renovated school was commissioned in April 2011.

Academics
Subjects offered at "O" Level include:

At "A" Level, subjects offered are categorised into Arts and Sciences. The Arts subjects offered are:

 
The Science subjects offered are:

Subsidiary Mathematics and General Paper are compulsory subjects and students are required to choose one to offer with their three chosen Arts or Sciences subjects.

Notable alumni
 Opiyo Oloya, Ugandan-born educator, author, broadcaster, and journalist, resident in Canada
 Professor Jack Nyeko Penmogi, Academician, Former parliamentary Legislator and former Vice Chancellor of Gulu University
 Professor Ogenga Latigo, Academician, Parliamentary Legislature & a farmer
 Casiano Wadri, Parliamentary Legislator and Human Right Activist

See also
 Education in Uganda
 List of schools in Uganda
 Gulu District

References

External links

Gulu District
Boarding schools in Uganda
Educational institutions established in 1953
Secondary schools in Uganda
Boys' schools in Uganda
1953 establishments in Uganda